Taru is an album recorded by jazz trumpeter Lee Morgan, recorded in 1968, but not released on the Blue Note label until 1980. The album features performances by Morgan, Bennie Maupin, John Hicks, George Benson, Reggie Workman and Billy Higgins.

Reception
The AllMusic review by Scott Yanow stated: "His sextet (which includes Bennie Maupin on tenor, guitarist George Benson, pianist John Hicks, bassist Reggie Workman, and drummer Billy Higgins) is quite advanced for the period and inspires Morgan to some fiery and explorative playing."

Track listing 
All compositions by Lee Morgan, except as indicated.
 "Avotcja One" (Hicks) – 6:45
 "Haeschen" – 6:13
 "Dee Lawd" – 5:52
 "Get Yourself Together (Get Yo'self Togetha)" – 6:27
 "Taru, What's Wrong with You" (Cal Massey) – 5:20
 "Durem" – 7:28

Personnel 
 Lee Morgan – trumpet
 Bennie Maupin – tenor saxophone
 John Hicks – piano
 George Benson – guitar
 Reggie Workman – bass
 Billy Higgins – drums

References 

Hard bop albums
Lee Morgan albums
1980 albums
Blue Note Records albums
Albums produced by Francis Wolff
Albums produced by Duke Pearson
Albums recorded at Van Gelder Studio